The S.J. Mickelsen Hardware Store and Lumber Yard, located at 12580-12582 S. Fort St. in Draper, Utah, dates from 1912.  It was listed on the National Register of Historic Places in 2004;  the listing included five contributing buildings.

It is a six-building complex, with a two-story brick building built in 1912 and other buildings constructed as late as 1932.  It served as a lumber and hardware store, and, during 1914–1961, served as the post office for Draper.

References

Commercial buildings on the National Register of Historic Places in Utah
Buildings designated early commercial in the National Register of Historic Places
Commercial buildings completed in 1912
Buildings and structures in Draper, Utah
1912 establishments in Utah
National Register of Historic Places in Salt Lake County, Utah